The Toronto Rock are a lacrosse team based in Toronto playing in the National Lacrosse League (NLL). The 2010 season was the 14th in franchise history, and 13th as the Rock. 

Shortly after the 2009 season ended, the Rock franchise was sold to Jamie Dawick, a professional poker player and businessman from nearby Oakville, Ontario. Dawick's first move was to bring Terry Sanderson back on board as general manager. Sanderson soon hired former Calgary Roughnecks head coach Troy Cordingley to coach the Rock and the Rock's fortunes changed immediately.

They finished the 2010 season with a 9–7 record, their best record since their Championship win in 2005 and made the playoffs for the first time in three years. They defeated the Buffalo Bandits and Orlando Titans to get to the Championship game for the seventh time in team history but were defeated by the Washington Stealth.

Regular season

Conference standings

Game log
Reference:

Playoffs

Game log
Reference:

Transactions

New players
 Sandy Chapman - acquired in trade
 Colin Doyle - acquired in trade
 Mike Hominuck - acquired in trade
 Pat McCready - acquired in trade
 Phil Sanderson - acquired in trade
 Kim Squire - signed as a free agent

Players not returning
 Jason Clark - released
 Craig Conn - traded
 Jason Crosbie - released
 Chris Driscoll - traded
 Bill McGlone - traded
 Lewis Ratcliff - traded
 Mark Scherman - traded
 Chad Thompson - released
 Luke Wiles - traded

Trades

Entry draft
The 2009 NLL Entry Draft took place on September 9, 2009. The Rock selected the following players:

Roster

See also
2010 NLL season

References

Toronto
2010 in Toronto
2010 in Canadian sports